The 2017–18 Luxembourg Women's Cup was the seventeenth Luxembourg Women's Cup in football. The competition began on 13 September 2017 and the final was held on 9 June 2018. Jeunesse Junglinster won their sixth Luxembourg Women's Cup after defeating Ell 7–6 on penalties.

Preliminary round 

The match was played on 13 September 2017.

|}

Round of 32 

The matches were played from 7 October 2017 to 15 October 2017.

|}

Round of 16 

The matches were played on 20 March 2018 and 21 March 2018.

|}

Quarterfinals

The matches were played on 8 May 2018.

|}

Semifinals 

The matches were played on 2 June 2018.

|}

Final

The final was played on 9 June 2018. Jeunesse Junglinster won the double after also winning the 2017–18 Dames Ligue 1.

References

Women's Cup